The Andean vesper mouse (Calomys lepidus) is a species of rodent in the family Cricetidae.
It is found in Argentina, Bolivia, Chile, and Peru.

Andean vesper mice are typically found at high elevations in the altiplano region. Due to their location, there are very few studies about them.

References

 Baillie, J. 1996.  Calomys lepidus.   2006 IUCN Red List of Threatened Species.   Downloaded on 9 July 2007.
Musser, G. G. and M. D. Carleton. 2005. Superfamily Muroidea. pp. 894–1531 in Mammal Species of the World a Taxonomic and Geographic Reference. D. E. Wilson and D. M. Reeder eds. Johns Hopkins University Press, Baltimore.

Mammals of Argentina
Mammals of Bolivia
Mammals of Chile
Mammals of Peru
Calomys
Mammals described in 1884
Taxa named by Oldfield Thomas
Taxonomy articles created by Polbot